Xyleborus affinis, the sugarcane shot-hole borer, is a species of typical ambrosia beetle in the family Curculionidae. It is found on all forested continents, primarily in areas with humid tropical climates.

Subspecies
These two subspecies belong to the species Xyleborus affinis:
 Xyleborus affinis affinis
 Xyleborus affinis mascarensis Eichhoff, 1878

References

Further reading

 
 

Scolytinae
Articles created by Qbugbot
Beetles described in 1868